Julia Mallam (born 1 August 1982) is an English actress. She is best known for the roles of Dawn Woods in the ITV soap opera Emmerdale and Tracy Trickster in the CITV series Captain Mack.

Career 
Mallam made her professional acting debut in 2001 as Jane Greenwood in Peak Practice. She appeared as Dawn Hope in Emmerdale between 2003 and 2006, when her character died of cardiac arrest after being injured in a house explosion.

She appeared in Soapstar Superchef with Sherrie Hewson in 2007. They reached the final, losing to Hayley Tamaddon and Mathew Bose. Layter that year, she appeared in an episode of the police drama The Bill. In 2008, she played various characters in the children's television series Captain Mack.

Filmography

References

External links
 

1982 births
Living people
English television actresses
Actors from Doncaster
Actresses from Yorkshire
English soap opera actresses
Schoolteachers from Yorkshire